INS Tarasa (T94) is a patrol vessel of the Car Nicobar-class of Indian Navy and the last ship in the series of four Water Jet Fast Attack Craft (WJFAC).

GRSE handed over the ship to the Indian Navy in Kolkata on 15 June 2017. From Kolkata, the ship will sail to Mumbai for its official commissioning. The ship was commissioned by Vice Admiral Girish Luthra, Flag Officer Commanding-in-Chief, Western Naval Command on 26 September 2017 at Mumbai. She will based under the operational control of Western Naval Command at Mumbai. Her commissioning Commanding officer is Lieutenant Commander Praveen Kumar.

References

Car Nicobar-class patrol vessels
2016 ships